Kiss Unplugged is a live album by the American rock band Kiss, released in 1996. It was recorded in studio for the television program MTV Unplugged and released as part of a series of live and video albums. It is the first Kiss live album that is not part of the Alive! series.

Overview
On August 9, 1995, the band performed at  Sony Music Studios in New York City for the TV show MTV Unplugged. Paul Stanley and Gene Simmons contacted former members Peter Criss and Ace Frehley and invited them to participate. It marked the only time the original lineup performed publicly without their trademark makeup and was also the only time Frehley and Criss shared a stage with Eric Singer and Bruce Kulick. It was the first time Singer had part of a lead vocal on an album (shared with Criss on "Nothin' to Lose"). 

Fan reaction to Criss and Frehley at the show was so positive that, in 1996, the original lineup of Kiss reunited, with all four original members together for the first time since 1979.

"The sound was deafening: the sound of rock 'n' roll history coming full circle in a TV studio", wrote Kerrang!s Don Kaye in a review of the taping at New York's Sony Music Studios. "Complete pandemonium ensued as they struck the opening chords to '2,000 Man', and it continued when Ace's voice rang out in the clear, sardonic manner we all know and love.

Release
On March 12, 1996, the concert was released on CD. The LP version of the album includes a poster and some were pressed on yellow marbled vinyl.

A stand-alone VHS and DVD documentary were produced around the same time as the CD release, with archival footage of the band's rehearsal sessions at SIR Studios in New York. It also shows the first "KISS Konvention" appearance earlier in the year, with Criss joining the touring members on stage to sing a few tunes. According to Criss, this invite gave Simmons the idea of reaching out to both him and Frehley to be a part of the Unplugged taping in an unannounced reunion. Because of the contentious split, the worldwide fan base never thought this would happen, and it was kept a closely held secret until the day of the event.

On December 18, 2007, the performance appeared as part of the Kissology Volume Three: 1992–2000 DVD set. This included the original DVD release of the concert plus five previously unreleased songs: "Hard Luck Woman" (with Stanley on vocals), "Heaven's on Fire", "Spit" (mostly sung by the audience), "C'mon and Love Me", and a country version of "God of Thunder".

Reception

Contemporary reviews were mixed. Rolling Stone defined the show "one of the most pointless MTV Unplugged segments imaginable", while Rock Hard called Unplugged "the weakest output of the entire KISStory", saved only by a few classic songs. On the other hand, Danny Eccleston in Q observed that "cheatingly, the ambience is muscularly electro-acoustic, but the tunes happily hail from the classic slap period, throwing the simply great pop of 'Goin' Blind' and the Beatley 'Sure Know Something' into pin-sharp focus."

Modern reviews are more positive. AllMusic reviewer stated that the musicians "exceeded expectations and, given their newfound energy, charisma, and love for the music, their performance provided the catalyst for the beginning of a successful world reunion tour." Canadian journalist Martin Popoff remarked how many tracks "sound campfire comfy done this way, the unplugged format exposing the no-brains all-heart pop craft of these songs".

Track listing

Personnel
Kiss
Paul Stanley – acoustic guitar, lead and backing vocals
Gene Simmons – acoustic bass guitar, lead and backing vocals
Bruce Kulick – acoustic guitar (all tracks except 12–13)
Eric Singer – drums (all tracks except 12–13), lead vocals (14)

Additional musicians
Ace Frehley – acoustic guitar (12–15), lead vocals (12, 15), backing vocals (14–15)
Peter Criss – drums (12, 14–15), lead vocals (13–15), backing vocals (14–15)
Phillip Ashley – piano on "Every Time I Look at You"
Jon Grindstaff – conductor, string arrangements on "Every Time I Look at You"

Production
Alex Coletti – producer
Joe Perota – director
Randy Ezratty – engineer
James 'Jimbo' Barton – mixing
Ralph Patlan, Tat – mastering at Precision Mastering, Hollywood
Stephen Marcussen, Don C. Tyler – mastering assistants
Susan McEowen – design
Tim Rozner, Tommy Thayer – production coordinators

Charts
Album

 Singles

Certifications

References

1996 live albums
Kiss
Kiss (band) live albums
Kiss (band) video albums
1996 video albums
Live video albums
Mercury Records live albums